Velleia macrophylla, or large-leaved Velleia, is a perennial herb in the family Goodeniaceae, which is endemic to  Western Australia.
It grows on moist sites in Beard's South-west province. It flowers from October to December or January.

The species was first described as Euthales macrophylla by John Lindley in 1840. The species was redescribed by George Bentham in 1868 as Velleia macrophylla.

References

External links 
 The Australasian Virtual Herbarium – Occurrence data for Velleia macrophylla.

macrophylla
Endemic flora of Western Australia
Taxa named by George Bentham
Plants described in 1840
Eudicots of Western Australia